Charles Marvin "Doc" Hollister (September 2, 1867 – May 18, 1923) was an American football and baseball coach and college athletics administrator. He served as the head football coach at Beloit College from 1896 to 1897 and at Northwestern University from 1899 to 1902, compiling a career college football record of 33–21–6. Hollister's record at Northwestern was 27–16–4.  Hollister also served as the athletic director at Northwestern from 1898 to 1902 and as the school's baseball coach for one season in 1906, tallying a mark of 3–7.

Head coaching record

Football

References

External links
 

1867 births
1923 deaths
Beloit Buccaneers baseball coaches
Beloit Buccaneers football coaches
Northwestern Wildcats athletic directors
Northwestern Wildcats baseball coaches
Northwestern Wildcats football coaches
People from Pawlet, Vermont